1990 The Citadel Bulldogs baseball team represented The Citadel in the 1990 NCAA Division I baseball season.  The Bulldogs played their home games in College Park. The team was coached by Chal Port, in his 26th season at The Citadel.

The Bulldogs won their first Southern Conference baseball tournament, hosted in their home park.  They then went on to win the Atlantic Regional of the 1990 NCAA Division I baseball tournament, earning a berth in the 1990 College World Series.  During the regular season, The Citadel won 26 consecutive games, the longest of any team in the 1990 season.  The Bulldogs were ranked #6 in the final Collegiate Baseball poll.

Three players from the team would go on to serve as head coaches at the Division I level.  Dan McDonnell became head coach at Louisville in 2007, Chris Lemonis became head coach at Indiana in 2015, and Tony Skole served as head coach at East Tennessee State from 2000 to 2017 before taking over at The Citadel in 2018.

Roster

Schedule

References

The Citadel Bulldogs baseball seasons
Citadel Bulldogs
College World Series seasons
Southern Conference baseball champion seasons
Citadel
Citadel